Subal Kumar Dey is an Indian journalist from Agartala, Tripura. He is the founder and chief editor of the Bengali language daily newspaper Syandan Patrika and Syandan TV, a news channel. He is the current president of Tripura Newspapers' Society (TNS), Agartala Press Club, member of Friends (A Cricket Club of Tripura).

Personal life
He was born into an Indian Bengali family. Kalyani Dey, former Agartala municipal councilor, was his wife. She died on 23 February 2020.

Drohokal is his Bengali language autobiography published in 2019. It tells the story of his 50 years of journalism.

See also 
 List of Indian journalists

References

External links 
 Subal Kumar Dey on  Official Page of Syandan Patrika
 Drohokal - Subal Kumar Dey's autobiography
https://thesamacharbharat.in/bhupendra-chandra-datta-bhowmik-media-centre-set-up-at-agartala-press-club-with-the-financial-support-of-dainik-sambad-has-started-its-journey-on-sunday/

Journalists from Tripura
Living people
Indian journalists
Indian founders
Year of birth missing (living people)